In plasma physics, an ion acoustic wave is one type of longitudinal oscillation of the ions and electrons in a plasma, much like acoustic waves traveling in neutral gas. However, because the waves propagate through positively charged ions, ion acoustic waves can interact with their electromagnetic fields, as well as simple collisions. In plasmas, ion acoustic waves are frequently referred to as acoustic waves or even just sound waves.  They commonly govern the evolution of mass density, for instance due to pressure gradients, on time scales longer than the frequency corresponding to the relevant length scale.  Ion acoustic waves can occur in an unmagnetized  plasma or in a magnetized plasma parallel to the magnetic field. For a single ion species plasma and in the long wavelength limit, the waves are dispersionless with a speed  given by (see derivation below)

Normally γe is taken to be unity, on the grounds that the thermal conductivity of electrons is large enough to keep them isothermal on the time scale of ion acoustic waves, and γi is taken to be 3, corresponding to one-dimensional motion. In collisionless plasmas, the electrons are often much hotter than the ions, in which case the second term in the numerator can be ignored.

Derivation 
We derive the ion acoustic wave dispersion relation for a linearized fluid description of a plasma with electrons and  ion species. We write each quantity as where subscript 0 denotes the "zero-order" constant equilibrium value, and 1 denotes the first-order perturbation.   is an ordering parameter for linearization, and has the physical value 1. The terms involving only subscript-0 quantities are all order and must balance, and terms with one subscript-1 quantity are all order and balance. We treat the electric field as order-1 and neglect magnetic fields, 

Each species  is described by mass , charge , number density , flow velocity , and pressure . We assume the pressure perturbations for each species are a Polytropic process, namely  for species . The polytropic assumption essentially replaces the energy equation.

Each species satisfies the continuity equationand the momentum equation

.

We now linearize, and work with order-1 equations. Using the ion continuity equation, the ion momentum equation becomes

We relate the electric field  to the electron density by the electron momentum equation:

We now neglect the left-hand side, which is due to electron inertia. This is valid for waves with frequencies much less than the electron plasma frequency . The resulting electric field is

Since we have already solved for the electric field, we cannot also find it from Poisson's equation. The ion momentum equation now relates  for each species to :

We arrive at a dispersion relation via Poisson's equation:

The first bracketed term on the right is zero by assumption (charge-neutral equilibrium). We substitute for the electric field and rearrange to find
.
 defines the electron Debye length. The second term on the left arises from the  term, and reflects the degree to which the perturbation is not charge-neutral. If  is small we may drop this term.  This approximation is sometimes called the plasma approximation.

We now work in Fourier space, and write each order-1 field as   We drop the tilde since all equations now apply to the Fourier amplitudes, and find 

 is the wave phase velocity. To find the dispersion relation for natural modes, we look for solutions for  nonzero and find:

A unitless version of this equation is

If  is small (the plasma approximation), we can neglect the second term on the right-hand side, and the wave is dispersionless  with  independent of k.

Dispersion relation 
All of the roots should be real-positive, since we have neglected damping. The two signs of  correspond to right- and left-moving waves. For a single ion species,

We now consider multiple ion species, for the common case .  For , the dispersion relation has N-1 degenerate roots , and one non-zero root

This non-zero root is called the "fast mode", since  is typically greater than all the ion thermal speeds.

A case of interest to nuclear fusion is an equimolar mixture of deuterium and tritium ions. Let us specialize to full ionization, equal temperatures, polytrope exponents , and neglect the  contribution.

Another case of interest is one with two ion species of very different masses. An example is a mixture of gold (A=197) and boron (A=10.8), which is currently of interest in hohlraums for laser-driven inertial fusion research. We leave the boron atomic fraction  unspecified (note ).

Damping 
Ion acoustic waves are damped both by Coulomb collisions and collisionless Landau damping.  The Landau damping occurs on both electrons and ions, with the relative importance depending on parameters.

See also
 Waves in plasmas
 Sound
 Alfvén wave
 Magnetosonic wave
 List of plasma (physics) articles

External links
Various patents and articles related to fusion, IEC, ICC and plasma physics

Waves in plasmas